Point Place is a neighborhood in North Toledo, Ohio. Point Place was originally part of Washington Township, Lucas County in the 1800s, and was annexed into the city of Toledo, Ohio in 1937. Point Place is surrounded by the Ottawa River, Lake Erie, the Maumee Bay and the Maumee River.

Transportation 

Point Place is near two major interstates, I-75, and I-280, which connects to I-80 (I-80/90). Summit Street runs through the middle of Point Place, and serves as the major center of commerce.

Parks 
 Cullen Park 
 Detwiler Park
 Edgewater Park
 Friendship Park
 Harry Kessler Park
 Shoreland Park

References

Neighborhoods in Toledo, Ohio